Totem is a 2017 American supernatural horror film directed by Marcel Sarmiento and starring Kerris Dorsey, Ahna O’Reilly and James Tupper. The film is written by Evan Dickson, from a story by Dickson and Sarmiento. The film is a co-production between Blumhouse Productions, Divide/Conquer and Gunpowder & Sky.

The film was released on October 31, 2017 by Cinemax.

Premise
When widowed father James asks his new-age girlfriend to move in, his daughters Kellie and Abby have trouble adjusting. As things become increasingly tense, a series of unexplained occurrences leads Kellie to look for a way to use a totem to control the supernatural presence in the house.Promoted to leading lady of the house following her mother Lexy’s untimely death, 17-year-old Kellie has done a respectable job keeping together the tight trio that includes her father James and little sister Abby.  For his part, James thinks it’s time to add a new face to their fold, and invites his long-term girlfriend Robin to finally move in so their family can move on.

Kellie isn’t overjoyed at the interloper in their midst.  Neither is the supernatural spirit suddenly haunting their home.  Robin’s arrival strangely coincides with an unseen entity paying regular visits to Abby.  The little girl claims it is her mother’s protective ghost.  Kellie fears the spirit isn’t as benevolent as Abby innocently presumes.

After recovering a necklace that belonged to Lexy, Kellie finds it is capable of causing objects in the house to move on their own.  Maybe it’s her mother interacting from beyond the grave(while she was trying to escape from totem to her family).  Maybe it’s something more malevolent.  As the entity seemingly strengthens, it threatens to tear everyone apart through the paranormal power of the mysterious totem now in Kellie’s possession.

Cast 
 Kerris Dorsey as Kellie
 Ahna O'Reilly as Robin 
 James Tupper as James
 Lia McHugh as Abby
 Braeden Lemasters as Todd
 Lawrence Pressman as Bernard

Production
Principal photography on the film began in November 2015.

Additional photography took place in December 2016.

Release
The film was shot in the 2:35:1 aspect ratio but was cropped to 1:78:1 to fit HBO/Cinemax broadcast standards. The film was released on October 31, 2017.

References

External links 
 
 Totem on Letterboxd

2017 horror films
2017 horror thriller films
2010s psychological horror films
American horror television films
American supernatural horror films
American supernatural thriller films
American psychological horror films
American psychological thriller films
Supernatural drama films
American psychological drama films
American horror thriller films
2010s teen horror films
American horror drama films
Blumhouse Productions films
Cinemax original films
2010s English-language films
2010s American films